The Frieze of Parnassus is a large sculpted stone frieze encircling the podium, or base, of the Albert Memorial in London, England. The Albert Memorial was constructed in the 1860s in memory of Prince Albert, the husband of Queen Victoria.

The frieze is named after Mount Parnassus, the favorite resting place in Ancient Greek mythology for the muses. It contains 169 life-size full-length sculptures, a mixture of low-relief and high-relief, of individual composers, architects, poets, painters, and sculptors from history. The depictions of earlier figures necessarily, were imaginary, although many of the figures were based on materials contained in a collection of artworks and drawings gathered for the purpose of ensuring authentic depictions, where this was possible.

The total length of the frieze is approximately 64 metres (210 feet). The frieze was intended to be the 'soul' of the memorial, and the memorial's designer, George Gilbert Scott, stated that he was inspired by the Hémicycle des Beaux Arts by Paul Delaroche.  The memorial was not laid out precisely to directions of the compass, however, closely enough that the sides are referred to by direction.  Musicians and poets were placed on the south side, with painters on the east side, sculptors on the west side, and architects on the north side.

Henry Hugh Armstead carved the figures on the south and east sides, the painters, musicians, and poets (80 in total), and grouped them by national schools. John Birnie Philip carved the figures on the west and north sides, the sculptors and architects (89 named figures, plus two generic figures), and arranged them in chronological order.

The carving was executed in situ, and was said by Scott to be "perhaps one of the most laborious works of sculpture ever undertaken". The initial contracts, agreed around 1864, had specified that the work was to be completed in four years for £7,781 15s. The eventual cost, however, exceeded this by some £2,000 and the work was not finished until 1872.

Large groups of figures of eminent persons from the past often decorate public buildings and monuments of the later nineteenth century, and some buildings such as the Walhalla temple in Bavaria and the Panthéon in Paris were dedicated to this purpose.  Many figures of visual artists decorate the Victoria and Albert Museum close to the Albert Memorial at the other end of the "Albertopolis" complex. A mosaic frieze of more generalised figures from the arts runs round the circular Royal Albert Hall adjacent to the memorial. The Parnassus by Raphael (1511), opposite the philosophers of The School of Athens in the Vatican Raphael Rooms, is an earlier group portrait of great artists.

List of figures

Selection, arrangement, and omissions

The selection of figures reflects contemporary thinking, although even by the taste of the 1860s it seems odd to omit Schubert, then considered rather lightweight, whilst including Daniel Auber and Grétry.

Among the painters, a classical tradition predominates to the extent that there is no hint of Mannerism in the sixteenth century and Giulio Romano is omitted, nor is there any reference to Rococo taste, where a modern list would include Antoine Watteau and François Boucher. The painters represented in the frieze reflect to some extent, Albert's own taste for the "Primitives" of the late Middle Ages, although Duccio is absent. Botticelli and Vermeer were yet to be rediscovered, and El Greco, Caravaggio and Goya, who would all figure in a modern canon, mostly were regarded with suspicion.

No English poet after John Milton was featured. Among the architects, the figure of Nitocris, the only figure representing a woman on the frieze, may have been selected because it was at one time thought that she was the pharaoh responsible for the pyramid now credited to Menkaura.

Other figures commemorated elsewhere on the Albert Memorial, on the canopy mosaics, but not on the frieze, are Apelles (painting), King Solomon (architecture) and King David (poetry). The preferred south side of the memorial, being the direction in which Albert's statue faces, is populated by poets and musicians, with poets at the centre in accordance with the Victorian concept of poetry as the highest of the arts.

The arrangement of the other groups also reflects this Victorian thinking, with the fine arts of the sculptors and painters on the east and west sides, joining a spiritual side on the south (the poets and musicians) and a material side on the north (the architects). At least three of the sides also have a central, pre-eminent figure seated on a throne, with Homer for the poets, Raphael for the painters, and Michelangelo for the sculptors.

Scott originally intended the last of the architects depicted in full to be himself, however, after all the other characters had been chosen, he realised he'd forgotten Pugin, the great genius of the Victorian Gothic Revival.  So Scott replaced his own statue with Pugin's, and then placed himself as a relief head, looking over Pugin's shoulder.

Authenticity and details

Authentic points of detail and historical accuracy include Phidias being depicted as bald, the phorminx (lyre) being held by the bard Homer, William Hogarth's dog, Paolo Veronese's hand resting on a greyhound, Daniel Auber's right arm in a sling, the building models held by William of Wykeham and Jean de Chelles, the model of Trajan's Column held by Apollodorus of Damascus, the object held by Hiram, the sculptures held by Dibutades and Phidias, Ghiberti leaning on a panel, the sculptures  being held by Donatello and Michelangelo, and the statue being admired by the group to the right of Cellini.

Authentic period detail also is seen in much of the clothing, the details of facial hair, furniture, and accessories, including scrolls, books, swords, and palettes. The figures are posed, either in isolation or in groups, with some figures facing each other in poses of admiration or engaged deeply in conversation.

References

External links

History of the design and construction of the podium figures
Critical commentary and evaluation of the depictions of the poets, musicians and painters

Friezes
Stone sculptures in the United Kingdom
Monuments and memorials in London
1872 sculptures
1872 establishments in England